Robert Sarkies (born 6 March 1967) is a New Zealand film director and screenwriter.

Sarkies grew up in the South Island city of Dunedin. He attended Kaikorai Valley College. His three feature films to date have been set in Dunedin, or in the lower South Island. After his debut feature Scarfies, Sarkies followed it in 2006 with Out of the Blue, based on the 1990 Aramoana Massacre, then black comedy Two Little Boys, starring Bret McKenzie and Australia's Hamish Blake.

Short films
Sarkies began making short films as a teenager with fellow filmmaker Simon Perkins and Lindsay Chalmers. After winning an international award for his short Dream-makers, Sarkies began work on his most ambitious short to date: adventure comedy Signing Off (1996), which won four international awards and helped attract funding for Scarfies (1999), his feature debut. Signing Off was produced by film and television producer Lisa Chatfield.

Feature films
Sarkies co-wrote the Scarfies script with his younger brother, playwright and performer Duncan and award winning producer Lisa Chatfield. Winner of seven awards including Best Picture and Best Director at the NZ Film Awards, and a local hit, the film is part comedy, part thriller, and partly a celebration of being a university student in Dunedin. Scarfies was later released on video in the United States under the title Crime 101.

Sarkies' second feature was drama Out of the Blue based on the 1990 Aramoana Massacre, in which a gunman killed thirteen people in a seaside town close to Dunedin. The film emphasizes realism over melodrama, partly through handheld camerawork and a naturalistic acting style. Some of those living in Aramoana expressed opposition to the film being made; others who lost people in the tragedy agreed to do interviews with scriptwriters Sarkies and Graeme Tetley.

In New Zealand, Out of the Blue became the tenth most successful local film yet released theatrically (not accounting for inflation). It also won six Qantas Film and Television Awards in September 2008, including "Best Picture - budget over $1 million". As of October 2008, Out of the Blue's rating on critics' website Rotten Tomatoes was 91 per cent.

Sarkies' third feature was 2012 black comedy Two Little Boys, starring Bret McKenzie and Australian television personality Hamish Blake. The film is based on a book by Duncan Sarkies, about two sometime friends trying to hide the body of a tourist one of them has accidentally killed.

Before making Out of the Blue, the Sarkies brothers collaborated on the script for a proposed fantasy film called The Magnificent Magic Fingers. The budget for Magic Fingers was estimated to be at least NZ$20 million. It is unknown whether Magic Fingers is still in development or not.

Television
In 2010, dystopian TV series This Is Not My Life debuted on New Zealand Television. The series centres around a man (played by Charles Mesure) who wakes up with no knowledge of the woman he appears to be married to, his children or job. Directed by Sarkies and Peter Salmon, it won a 2011 New Zealand television award for best drama series.

References

External links

Living people
New Zealand film directors
Mass media people from Dunedin
1967 births
People educated at Kaikorai Valley College
University of Otago alumni